Chambave (Valdôtain:  or ; Issime ) is a town and comune in the Aosta Valley region of northwestern Italy.

The communal territory is crossed by the Dora Baltea.

Wine

Growers in Chambave produce several Italian wines under the Valle d'Aosta DOC including a rosso, sweet wine Muscat and a straw wine.

Chambave rouge - Must contain a minimum of 60% Petit Rouge with Dolcetto, Gamay and Pinot noir making up the rest of the blend. Beyond the Vallée d'Aoste DOC requirement, grapes destined for Chambave rouge must be harvested to a more limited maximum yield of 10 tonnes/ha and be fermented to a minimum 11% alcohol with the six months of aging taking place in wood (usually oak) barrels.
Muscat de Chambave - Sweet white made from the Muscat de Chambave grape. Harvested to a maximum yield of 10 tonnes/ha and fermented to a minimum alcohol level of 11% with three months aging in wood.
Muscat de Chambave flétri - Straw wine produced from Muscat de Chambave grapes that have been left to dry into raisins and then fermented to a minimum alcohol level of 16.5% with two years of aging in wood.

Twin towns – sister cities
Chambave is twinned with:

  Saint-Laurent-de-Mure, France

References

Cities and towns in Aosta Valley